is a film made by Toei Company in 1973.
It is the third in the Female Convict Scorpion series, following Female Convict 701: Scorpion and Female Convict Scorpion: Jailhouse 41 (both 1972). The star (Meiko Kaji) and director (Shunya Itō) were paired in all three.

Plot

Matsushima is outside the prison and on the run from the police, wanted for breaking out of prison and murder. On her trail is detective Kondo (Mikio Narita). She takes refuge with a woman who has a brother with a mental disability. After the brother attempts to sexually assault Matsushima, she cuts him with a knife as a warning. The woman ultimately reveals her brother frequently takes advantage of her. Both the police and an ex-prison mate of Matsushima's pursue her.

Cast
 Meiko Kaji as Nami Matsushima, the Scorpion
 Mikio Narita as Detective Kondo
 Reisen Lee as Katsu
 Yayoi Watanabe as Yuki
 Kōji Nanbara as Sameshima
 Takashi Fujiki as Tanida
 Tomoko Mayama as Shinobu

Release
Female Convict Scorpion: Beast Stable was released in Japan on 29 July 1973.

Notes

Sources

External links 
 
 

1970s crime thriller films
1973 films
Female Convict Scorpion series
Live-action films based on manga
Films directed by Shunya Itō
1970s Japanese-language films
Pink films
Toei Company films
Women in prison films
Japanese prison films
1970s prison drama films
Films scored by Shunsuke Kikuchi
Incest in film
1970s Japanese films